The Nakanoshima Park (中之島公園 Nakanoshima kōen) is the first public park opened by Osaka in 1891, after its foundation as a city. It is located in Kita ward, on the Nakanoshima (中之島) sandbank, lying between Dōjima and Tosabori Rivers. The 11 hectare park houses public facilities such as Osaka Central Public Hall (built in 1918), Osaka Prefectural Nakanoshima Library and Museum of Oriental Ceramics. It also holds a rose garden. The City Hall of Osaka building is located on its west end.

Train stations
Kitahama Station (Keihan Railway Keihan Line, Osaka Municipal Subway Sakaisuji Line)
Naniwabashi Station (Keihan Railway Nakanoshima Line)
Yodoyabashi Station (Keihan Railway Keihan Line, Osaka Municipal Subway Midosuji Line)
Ōebashi Station (Keihan Railway Nakanoshima Line)
Higobashi Station (Osaka Municipal Subway Yotsubashi Line)
Watanabebashi Station (Keihan Railway Nakanoshima Line)

Establishments

 Osaka Central Public Hall: Established in 1918, it is Neo-Renaissance architecture. A nationally Important Cultural Property.
 Osaka Prefectural Nakanoshima Library: Established in 1904, it is Neo-Baroque Architecture. A nationally Important Cultural Property.
Bank of Japan Osaka branch.
Museum of Oriental Ceramics: Established by donation from Ataka family (They were trader.)

References

External links
 Osaka Prefectural Nakanoshima Library
 Museum of Oriental Ceramics

Nakanoshima
Urban public parks in Japan
Tourist attractions in Osaka
Parks and gardens in Osaka